Pablo Ezequiel Aranda (born 16 May 2001) is an Argentine professional footballer who plays as a right-back for San Martín SJ, on loan from Lanús.

Club career
Aranda came through the youth ranks at Lanús, having joined in 2016. He was promoted into the first-team squad towards the end of 2020, initially appearing as an unused substitute for five matches; including twice in the Copa Libertadores second stage against São Paulo. Aranda made his senior debut on 20 November in the Copa de la Liga Profesional, with manager Luis Zubeldía substituting him on for the final forty minutes of a victory at La Bombonera against Boca Juniors. In January 2022 Aranda joined Primera Nacional club San Martín de San Juan on a loan deal until the end of the year.

International career
Aranda represented Argentina's U18s at the 2019 COTIF Tournament.

Career statistics
.

Notes

References

External links

2001 births
Living people
People from Temperley
Argentine footballers
Argentina youth international footballers
Association football defenders
Club Atlético Lanús footballers
San Martín de San Juan footballers
Sportspeople from Buenos Aires Province